
March Tian Boedihardjo is a Hong Kong mathematician. He is a former child prodigy of ethnic Hokkien descent with ancestry from Anxi, Quanzhou, China.

Biography
Boedihardjo was born to an ethnic Chinese family in Hong Kong, with family roots in Anxi, China. Boedihardjo moved to the United Kingdom in 2005, when his older brother Horatio began studying at the University of Oxford.

Boedihardjo finished his A-level exams in Britain at the age of nine years and three months, after attending Greene's College Oxford. He also gained 8 GCSEs. He was accepted at Hong Kong Baptist University, making him the youngest ever university student in Hong Kong. The university designed a tailored 5-year curriculum programme for Boedihardjo which he criticized as being too easy and unstimulating on the first day. He obtained B+ and A− in most of the mathematics course in his first year examination which entered him into the Dean's List. He was conferred a Bachelor of Science in Mathematical Science and a Master of Philosophy in Mathematics after completing his programme one year early in 2011.

After graduating from Hong Kong Baptist University, Boedihardjo studied at Texas A&M University as a visiting scholar and then as a PhD student. In 2017, Boediharjo took up the position of assistant adjunct professor at UCLA on a three-year contract, a position which he still held until 2020. He was a visiting assistant professor at UC Irvine from 2021 to 2022 before starting a postdoc at ETH Zurich, a position he holds as of 2023.

See also
List of child prodigies

Notes

References

External links
March Boedihardjo at Texas A&M

1998 births
Living people
21st-century American mathematicians
Alumni of Hong Kong Baptist University
Hokkien scientists
Hong Kong mathematicians
Texas A&M University alumni
University of California, Los Angeles faculty